Frederick Smith  (November 24, 1878 – February 4, 1964) was a professional baseball player. He was a right-handed pitcher for one season (1907) with the Cincinnati Reds.

External links

1878 births
1964 deaths
People from New Diggings, Wisconsin
Cincinnati Reds players
Major League Baseball pitchers
Baseball players from Wisconsin
Terre Haute Hottentots players
Harrisburg Senators players
Terre Haute Miners players